The 2012 Capital One Canada Cup of Curling was held from November 28 to December 2 at Mosaic Place in Moose Jaw, Saskatchewan. This was Moose Jaw's first time hosting the Canada Cup, and Saskatchewan's second time hosting the Canada Cup, which was held in Yorkton in 2009. TSN broadcast the tenth edition of the Canada Cup.

In the women's final, Stefanie Lawton won her third Canada Cup title with a win over Jennifer Jones's rink, skipped by Kaitlyn Lawes. Lawton secured the win with a draw to get one point, winning the game with a score of 6–4. In the men's final, Jeff Stoughton won his first Canada Cup title with a win over last year's runner-up Glenn Howard, drawing for one point in the final end to win the game with a score of 4–3.

The winners, Jeff Stoughton and Stefanie Lawton, qualified for the 2013 Canadian Olympic Curling Trials in Winnipeg, Manitoba, which will determine Canada's representatives for the 2014 Winter Olympic Games in Sochi, Russia. The winners will also be selected by the Canadian Curling Association to represent Team North America at the 2014 Continental Cup of Curling in Las Vegas, Nevada.

Qualification
A total of fourteen teams, seven men's and seven women's teams, have qualified for the Canada Cup through various means:

Men
Defending champion: Kevin Martin
2012 Tim Hortons Brier champion: Glenn Howard
2011–12 CTRS team: Mike McEwen
2011–12 CTRS team: Kevin Koe
2011–12 CTRS team: John Epping
2011–12 CTRS team: Jeff Stoughton
2011–12 CTRS team: Brad Gushue

Women
Defending champion: Jennifer Jones
2012 Scotties Tournament of Hearts champion: Heather Nedohin
2011–12 CTRS team: Sherry Middaugh
2011–12 CTRS team: Cathy Overton-Clapham
2011–12 CTRS team: Stefanie Lawton
2011–12 CTRS team: Chelsea Carey
2011–12 CTRS team: Crystal Webster

Men

Teams
The teams are listed as follows:

Round-robin standings
Final round-robin standings

Round-robin results
All times listed in Central Time Zone (UTC-6).

Draw 1
Wednesday, November 28, 9:00 am

Draw 2
Wednesday, November 28, 2:00 pm

Draw 3
Wednesday, November 28, 7:00 pm

Draw 4
Thursday, November 29, 9:00 am

Draw 5
Thursday, November 29, 2:00 pm

Draw 6
Thursday, November 29, 7:00 pm

Draw 7
Friday, November 30, 9:00 am

Draw 8
Friday, November 30, 2:00 pm

Draw 9
Friday, November 30, 7:00 pm

Tiebreaker
Saturday, December 1, 8:00 am

Playoffs

Semifinal
Saturday, December 1, 6:30 pm

Final
Sunday, December 2, 2:30 pm

Women

Teams
The teams are listed as follows:

Notes
  Kirsten Wall will replace Jennifer Jones, who is recovering from knee surgery and has recently given birth and the team competed as "team Jones"

Round-robin standings
Final round-robin standings

Round-robin results
All times listed in Central Time Zone (UTC-6).

Draw 1
Wednesday, November 28, 9:00 am

Draw 2
Wednesday, November 28, 2:00 pm

Draw 3
Wednesday, November 28, 7:00 pm

Draw 4
Thursday, November 29, 9:00 am

Draw 5
Thursday, November 29, 2:00 pm

Draw 6
Thursday, November 29, 7:00 pm

Draw 7
Friday, November 30, 9:00 am

Draw 8
Friday, November 30, 2:00 pm

Draw 9
Friday, November 30, 7:00 pm

Playoffs

Semifinal
Saturday, December 1, 12:30 pm

Final
Sunday, December 2, 9:30 am

References

External links

Canada Cup
Canada Cup (curling)
Sport in Moose Jaw
Curling competitions in Saskatchewan
2012 in Saskatchewan
November 2012 sports events in Canada
December 2012 sports events in Canada